In the Interwar period in Yugoslavia (1918–41), there were several veteran associations of Serbian guerrillas (known as "Chetniks") that had fought in Ottoman Macedonia (1903–12), Balkan Wars (1912–13) and World War I (1914–18).

Leading Chetniks were split between the Democratic Party (DS) and Radical Party (RS), and also between ties to the secret societies of the Black Hand and White Hand. These ideological differences led to the formation of several Chetnik associations. The first association, established in 1921, was split corresponding to the Yugoslavist DS and Serbian nationalist RS in 1924.

The most important figures in the Chetnik movement in this period were Puniša Račić, Ilija Trifunović-Birčanin and Kosta Milovanović-Pećanac. Following the proclamation of the 6 January Dictatorship by king Alexander I in 1929 and the establishment of the “integral Yugoslavism”, the various Chetnik associations re-organised themself into a single officially sanctioned group, the “Association of Chetniks”. However, even under the homogenizing pressures of dictatorship, the Chetniks were not a monolithic movement.

Background
 
The Serbian Chetnik Organization, founded by Serbian activists, organized guerrilla units dispatched into Ottoman territories to the south of the Kingdom of Serbia. In the 1904–12 period these guerrilla units conducted warfare in Macedonia, seeking to liberate the region and join it with Serbia. At first privately organized, its directions were soon taken over by the Serbian government. The guerrilla action accompanied the dissemination of nationalist propaganda (nationalization). The Chetniks, as an auxiliary force, played an active role in the Balkan Wars and World War I.

Associations

Aftermath

World War II

References

Sources

Further reading

External links

Chetniks
Kingdom of Yugoslavia
Serbian veterans' organizations